Paul Baade (born December 14, 1940) was a Democratic member of the Michigan House of Representatives during the 1990s and later served on the Muskegon County Board of Commissioners.

A native of Muskegon, Baade worked for the Muskegon Chronicle for 26 years. He was elected to the first of four terms in the House in 1990. After leaving the House due to term limits in 1998, Baade was elected to the Muskegon County board, where he served until his retirement in 2005.

He served in the United States Army reserves in the 486th Engineer Company.

References

1940 births
Living people
Journalists from Michigan
Members of the Michigan House of Representatives
United States Army soldiers
United States Army reservists
County commissioners in Michigan
20th-century American politicians
21st-century American politicians